OMGcon (sometimes stylized as OMG!con) is a three-day anime convention held during June at the Owensboro Convention Center in Owensboro, Kentucky. The convention was previously held in Paducah, Kentucky. The name of the convention comes from the common abbreviation of Oh My God.

Programming
The convention typically offers an artist alley, card tournaments, cosplay events, dance/rave, dealers, formal dance, LARPing, special guests, tabletop gaming, video game tournaments, and workshops.

OMGcon's 2016 raffle benefited the charity Cliff Hagan Boys and Girls Club, and raised around $4,000.

History
OMGcon was started because of the long travel time needed to attend other conventions. The convention moved to the Owensboro Convention Center in Owensboro, Kentucky for 2014 onwards. The decision was made to allow for the convention's growth. The Owenboro Convention Center had to be evacuated during the 2015 convention due to a bomb threat. In 2016, the convention began using space in the Holiday Inn for workshops. OMGcon also used all available space in the convention center, with its attendees and other events occupying every hotel room in Owensboro, Kentucky. In 2017, OMGcon again used the entire convention center, and all of Owensboro 1,369 hotel rooms were occupied.

OMGcon 2020 was cancelled due to the COVID-19 pandemic. OMGcon 2021 was also cancelled due to the COVID-19 pandemic. Online conventions were held in 2020 and 2021. OMGcon held HallOMGween over Halloween weekend 2021 at the Owensboro Convention Center and Towneplace Suites. The convention in 2022 had a mask policy.

List by year

References

External links
 OMGcon Website

Anime conventions in the United States
Festivals established in 2006
2006 establishments in Kentucky
Annual events in Kentucky
Owensboro, Kentucky
Tourist attractions in Daviess County, Kentucky
Conventions in Kentucky
June events